The Defense Technical Information Center (DTIC, pronounced "Dee-tick") is the repository for research and engineering information for the United States Department of Defense (DoD). DTIC's services are available to DoD personnel, federal government personnel, federal contractors and selected academic institutions. The general public can access unclassified information through its public website.

History
The DTIC traces its history to the June 1945 formation of the Air Documents Research Center (ADRC), a joint effort of the US Army Air Force, US Navy and Royal Air Force to build a single collection of captured German aeronautical research, based in London. The ADRC was initially tasked with the sorting of the document collection into three broad groups; documents that would assist the war in the Pacific theater, documents of immediate intelligence interest to the United States or British forces and documents of interest for future research.

With the ending of the war in 1945, the ADRC moved to Wright Field in Dayton, Ohio and became the Air Documents Division (ADD). In 1948, the secretaries of the Navy and Air Force redesigned ADD into the Central Air Documents Office (CADO) giving it the collection of captured documents and also broadened its mission to include collecting, processing and disseminating information.

In 1951, the group was renamed the Armed Services Technical Information Agency (ASTIA) to "provide an integrated program of scientific and technical services for the Department of Defense and its contractors". As part of this reorganization, a branch office was opened in the Library of Congress, Washington. One major project during the ASTIA era was to develop library catalog systems to organize the growing body of work. This led to the Uniterm indexing system in the early 1950s.

In 1963, the group was once again reorganized to become the Defense Documentation Center for Science and Technical Information (DDC), and placed under the direction of the Defense Supply Agency (DSA). The DDC moved to Cameron Station, Alexandria, Virginia. The name changed again in 1969 to become the DTIC. In 1995, it moved to Andrew T. McNamara Headquarters Complex, Fort Belvoir, Virginia, as part of the reformed Defense Logistics Agency.

Products and services

DTIC Public Website

DTIC Public Website is the public gateway to DTIC's products and services. Access to the unclassified information on this site is available.

R&E Gateway

The R&E Gateway—the Department of Defense's (DoD) authoritative and secure online resource for research, development, testing and evaluation (RDT&E) information. There are over 4.7 million Science and Technical (S&T) assets available on the R&E Gateway:( i.e., DoD scientific and technical reports,  planned and completed research, projects, DoD-funded research and engineering journal articles, budget exhibits (R2 and P40), DoD grant awards, International Agreements, etc.)

DTIC Online Classified
The Secure Internet Protocol Routing Network (SIPRNet), DTIC Online Classified provides access to DTIC's complete collection (unclassified, unlimited; unclassified, limited; classified up to SECRET) of technical reports. In addition, registered users have access to other websites housed on the SIPRNet, including DoDTechipedia Classified.

Information Analysis Centers

The DoD IAC's Research & Analysis Services provide access to information, knowledge, and best practices from the Government, industry, and academia to fulfill the mission and objectives applicable to the DoD RDT&E and Acquisition communities' needs.  These services are provided by the DoD IAC's three Basic Centers of Operation (BCOs); Cyber-Security and Information Systems, Defense Systems, and Homeland Defense and Security.  The BCO's rely on their extensive Subject Matter Expert (SME) network; which includes experienced engineers and scientists, retired senior military leaders, leading academic researchers, and industry experts; to solve our customer's toughest scientific and technical problems.."

See also
National Technical Information Service
Office of Scientific and Technical Information

References

 
United States Department of Defense agencies
Archives in the United States
Government databases in the United States
United States Department of Defense information technology
Government agencies established in 1945
1945 establishments in the United States